Coiled-coil domain-containing protein 70 is a protein that in humans is encoded by the CCDC70 gene.

References

External links

Further reading